Barbara Ellison (née Barbara Boucher, born July 29, 1943) is an American retired professional wrestler, better known by her ring name, Bette Boucher.

Early life 
Boucher was born in the small town Webster, Massachusetts on July 29, 1943, one of seven children born to parents of French descent. While attending high school, she excelled in baseball and track and field. As a young girl, she became an avid fan of professional wrestling. After befriending professional wrestler Pat Patterson, he introduced her to The Fabulous Moolah, who agreed to train her despite misgivings about her small stature.

Professional wrestling career 
In 1962, Boucher enrolled in The Fabulous Moolah's professional wrestling school in Columbia, South Carolina, training for six months before making her debut. She was given the ring name "Bette" by The Fabulous Moolah to appear more exotic. Her first bout was for Jim Crockett Promotions in North Carolina, losing to Penny Banner.

After wrestling for two years, Boucher joined the Minneapolis, Minnesota-based American Wrestling Association.

In the late-1960s, Boucher's sister Shirley began wrestling under the ring name "Rita Boucher". The sisters spent two years as a tag team before Shirley retired due to family commitments.

Boucher defeated The Fabulous Moolah to win the NWA World Women's Championship on September 17, 1966. The Fabulous Moolah regained the championship from her one-month later. As The Fabulous Moolah was billed as having held the championship uninterrupted for decades, title reigns such as this were not always recognized.

Boucher retired from professional wrestling in 1970 to start a family.

Personal life 
Boucher married in 1970. She and her husband had four children before divorcing in 1992.

Championships and accomplishments
National Wrestling Alliance
NWA World Women's Championship (1 time)

References

External links
 

1943 births
American female professional wrestlers
American people of French descent
Living people
People from Webster, Massachusetts
Professional wrestlers from Massachusetts
21st-century American women
20th-century professional wrestlers
NWA World Women's Champions